The 2015 Israel State Cup Final decided the winner of the 2014–15 Israel State Cup, the 80th season of Israel's main football cup. It was played 20 May 2015 at the Sammy Ofer Stadium in Haifa, between Maccabi Tel Aviv and Hapoel Be'er Sheva.

Background
Maccabi Tel Aviv were in their 34th final, having already won 22. Their most recent final was in 2005, winning 1-0 against Maccabi Hertzliya, and their last loss was in 1997 to Hapoel Be'er Sheva. It will be Hapoel Be'er Sheva's fourth final, Their most recent appearance in the final was in 2003, in which they lost on penalties against Hapoel Ramat Gan.

Road to the final

Details

Israel State Cup
State Cup
Cup 2015
Cup 2015
Israel State Cup matches